John Harland (1806–1868) was an English reporter and antiquary.

Life
Harland was born at Kingston upon Hull, and learned the trade of printing. He gained facility in shorthand, and a report in 1830 of a sermon by John Gooch Robberds led to his name being mentioned to John Edward Taylor, of the Manchester Guardian.  Taylor went to Hull to hire Harland.

Harland was head of the reporting staff of the Guardian until 1860, when he retired because of lameness. He died in Manchester on 23 April 1868.

Works
Harland edited 14 volumes for the Chetham Society in 13 years. He also published collections of Lancashire Lyrics and Lancashire Ballads, and, in conjunction with T. T. Wilkinson of Burnley, Lancashire Folklore. He wrote the history of Sawley Abbey, near Clitheroe, Yorkshire, and was revising Edward Baines's Lancashire at the time of his death.

Notes

Attribution

External links
 
 

1806 births
1868 deaths
Journalists from Kingston upon Hull
English male journalists
English antiquarians
The Guardian journalists
19th-century British journalists
19th-century English male writers